Rabbit Lake is a small lake in Parry Sound District in Central Ontario, Canada. It is part of the Great Lakes Basin, lies in geographic Wilson Township, and is within Island Lake Forest and Barrens Conservation Reserve. The lake exits at the southwest via an unnamed creek, then flows via the Still River to Byng Inlet on Georgian Bay, Lake Huron.

See also
List of lakes in Ontario

References

Other map sources:

Lakes of Parry Sound District